7079 aluminium alloy (UNS designation A97079) is a high strength, heat treatable wrought aluminium alloy used in the aircraft industry. Age-hardening heat treatment enhances the characteristics of AL 7079, eliminating variations in characteristics seen in Aluminium 7075.

Chemical composition

Heat treatment for aluminium 7079 
 Solution treatment 
 Aging treatment
 Annealing treatment

Machinability 
 Alloy 7079 T-6 provides qualities comparable to alloy 7075-T6
 -F condition provides acceptable results
 Improved machinability compared to fabricated and annealed tempers

Workability 
 Can be formed similar to 7075
 Annealing provides superior formability and noticeable decline in workability following solution heat treatment
 Form in “as-quenched” condition for best results

Applications 
 Mobile industry equipment
 Aircraft parts, including wing panels and bulkhead assemblies
 Hydraulic units
 Highly stressed parts

References

Aluminium alloys
Aluminium–zinc alloys